Legacy (1987) is a novel by American author James A. Michener. Set during the Iran–Contra affair of the 1980s, the story follows Major Norman Starr, who is called to testify in front of a congressional committee to account for his involvement in covert military actions. The novel is interspersed with historical "flashbacks" as Major Starr reflects on his ancestors and their own roles in American history.

Chapters
The Starrs
Jared Starr: 1726–1787 Jahayver
Simon Starr: 1759–1809
Justice Edmund Starr: 1780–1847
General Hugh Starr: 1833–1921
Emily Starr: 1858–1932
Richard Starr: 1890–1954
Rachel Denham Starr: 1928–
Norman Starr: 1951–
The Constitution of the United States

1987 American novels
American historical novels
Novels by James A. Michener
Random House books
Iran–Contra affair